The canton of Masevaux-Niederbruck (before 2021: Masevaux) is an administrative division of the Haut-Rhin department, northeastern France. Its borders were modified at the French canton reorganisation which came into effect in March 2015. Its seat is in Masevaux-Niederbruck.

It consists of the following communes:

Altenach
Ballersdorf
Balschwiller
Bellemagny
Bernwiller
Bréchaumont
Bretten
Buethwiller
Burnhaupt-le-Bas
Burnhaupt-le-Haut
Chavannes-sur-l'Étang
Dannemarie
Diefmatten
Dolleren
Eglingen
Elbach
Eteimbes
Falkwiller
Friesen
Fulleren
Gildwiller
Gommersdorf
Guevenatten
Guewenheim
Hagenbach
Le Haut-Soultzbach
Hecken
Hindlingen
Kirchberg
Largitzen
Lauw
Magny
Manspach
Masevaux-Niederbruck
Mertzen
Montreux-Jeune
Montreux-Vieux
Mooslargue
Oberbruck
Pfetterhouse
Retzwiller
Rimbach-près-Masevaux
Romagny
Saint-Cosme
Saint-Ulrich
Sentheim
Seppois-le-Bas
Seppois-le-Haut
Sewen
Sickert
Soppe-le-Bas
Sternenberg
Strueth
Traubach-le-Bas
Traubach-le-Haut
Ueberstrass
Valdieu-Lutran
Wegscheid
Wolfersdorf

References

Cantons of Haut-Rhin